The Adubi War (known locally as Ogun Adubi or Egba Uprising) was a conflict in June and July 1918 in the British Colony and Protectorate of Nigeria ostensibly because of the imposition of colonial taxation. Direct taxes were introduced by the colonial government along with existing forced labour obligations and fees. On 7 June, the British arrested 70 Egba chiefs and issued an ultimatum that resisters should lay down their arms, pay the taxes and obey the local leadership.

The War
On 11 June, a party of soldiers, recently returned from East Africa, were brought in to help police the area and keep the peace. On 13 June, Egba rebels pulled up railway lines at Agbesi and derailed a train. Other rebels demolished the train station at Wasinmi and murdered the British agent; the Oba Osile, the African leader of the north-eastern Egba district. Hostilities between the 30,000 rebels and colonial troops continued for about three weeks at Otite, Tappona, Mokoloki and Lalako but by 10 July, the rebellion had been put down and the leaders killed or arrested.

Aftermath
About 600 people were killed, including the British agent and the Oba Osile, although this may have been due to a dispute over land and unconnected to the uprising. The incident led to the abolition of Abeokutan independence in 1918 and the introduction of forced labour in the region; imposition of the direct taxes was postponed until 1925. Military personnel who suppressed the revolt received the Africa General Service Medal.

Footnotes

References

 
 
 

Egba people
Wars involving Nigeria
History of Nigeria
Wars involving the states and peoples of Africa
History of Abeokuta
Yoruba history
1918 in Nigeria
Nigeria in World War I
June 1918 events
July 1918 events
August 1918 events
African resistance to colonialism